Legends South is a mixed-income housing development located in the Bronzeville neighborhood of the South Side of Chicago. It will include nearly 2,400 new mixed-income rental and home ownership units. In 1996 HOPE VI funds were granted specifically for Legends South to replace the infamous Robert Taylor Homes.

References

External links
legendssouth.com
Video of Legends South Redevelopment

Neighborhoods in Chicago
Mixed-income housing
Housing in Illinois